Devil's claw may refer to:

Plants
 Harpagophytum species, native to Southern Africa and a herbal medicine
 some Pisonia species are known as "devil's-claws"
 Proboscidea species native to the southwestern United States and Mexico which produce a characteristic hooked seed pod.
 Senegalia greggii, a tree native to North America
 Martynia, a plant native to the desert regions of North America

Other
 Devil's claw (nautical), a metal hook for grabbing a ship's anchor chain
 The Devils Claw Formation, a geologic formation in British Columbia, Canada
 Devils Claw Mountain, a mountain in the Skeena Mountains in Canada